Dhünn is a -long river located in North Rhine-Westphalia, Germany. Its main source is near Wipperfürth in the Bergisches Land area. It runs in a south-westerly direction, and its mouth into the river Wupper is near Leverkusen, appr.  north of Cologne.

Renaturation 
By diverting the river bed of the Dhünn around the 'Sensenhammer' weir in April 2010, it was declared the first 'barrier-free river' in North Rhine-Westphalia. This means that the -long stretch of the river from the mouth into the Wupper to the 'Großen Dhünn' dam is accessible without obstacles for fish and microbes. Fish can now migrate again freely to their spawning grounds.

Sights along the river 
 Altenberg Abbey
 Berge castle (German: Burg Berge)
 Strauweiler castle (German: Schloss Strauweiler)
 Morsbroich castle (German: Schloss Morsbroich)
 Freudenthaler Sensenhammer museum (German: Museum Freudenthaler Sensenhammer)

See also
List of rivers of North Rhine-Westphalia

References

Rivers of North Rhine-Westphalia
Rivers of Germany